Paul Scott is an American politician who served as a member of the Oklahoma Senate from the 43rd district between 2016 and 2020.

Career
Paul Scott was first elected to the Oklahoma Senate in 2016.

In 2020, Scott faced a contested republican primary with two challengers, Jessica Garvin and Kaity Keith.
He failed to win the first round of the Republican primary by 0.1% of the vote, forcing him into a runoff with Garvin. The primary was reported as being hotly contested.
He lost a primary runoff and the Republican Party's nomination to Garvin.

Criticism
Scott was criticized for using campaign funds to purchase a National Rifle Association membership.

References

21st-century American politicians
Republican Party Oklahoma state senators
Living people
Year of birth missing (living people)